Declan O'Dwyer (born 1 August 1968, Ireland) is a writer, producer, and film and television director.

Declan is an EMMY Nominated Director (Free Rein, 2019). He has also directed an 'afternoon play' adaptation of an Andy McNab novella, The Grey Man and the adaptation of the Val McDermid's Torment of Others (Best Crime Novel of the Year 1995). BBC's flagship Robin Hood (Saturn Award Nomination for Best International Series). Declan directed the acclaimed TV movie  Prayer of the Bone  (Nominated in the 'Crime Thriller of the Year' awards 2008 and won an Edgar Allan Poe Award for best teleplay 2009) before directing the pilot episode of British supernatural drama Being Human – which went on to launch the critically acclaimed series. Declan has directed an adaptation of Ann Cleaves Vera novel The Seagull.  Declan was also a writer and director on Barbarians Rising. In 2014 Declan was the first international signing from The Black List website and his script also made into the official Black List and the Hollywood Hit list - of the top 100 new writers to watch. Declan directed and Executive Produced series one of Miss Scarlet and the Duke and was a director and Executive Producer on Flowers in the Attic: The Origin. In 2022 Declan directed the pilot episode of Rise of the Witches the television adaptation of The Orchards of Aribistan.

External links 

 News Article: http://www.screendaily.com/news/production/luke-evans-robert-carlyle-to-star-in-dogs-of-law/5024372.article
 News Article: https://web.archive.org/web/20110713025948/http://blogs.indiewire.com/theplaylist/archives/luke_evans_and_robert_carlyle_to_star_in_london_cop_thriller_dogs_of_law/

Irish television directors